SCD Independiente is the women's football section of SCD Independiente. The club is located in Palma de Mallorca (Balearic Islands, Spain). It plays in Liga Autonomica, first level of Balearic territorial football and fourth in Spanish women's football.

History
The team has been one of pioneering teams in women's territorial football in Mallorca, as it emerged a few years after recovery of competition on the island in 1996–97 season. Specifically, the section was set up in 1999–2000 season and has since competed without interruption, becoming one of most veteran clubs in competition.

Her long career is only comparable to CE Algaida (1997) and UD Collerense (1999), born in same year as SCD Independiente, but with a much more outstanding and brilliant journey in terms of sports results.

Since its foundation, it has been characterized by maintaining an average sporting potential, without major victories or notable titles. He was only promoted to Liga Autonómica in 2009 (result of creation of this category) and suffered a relegation to Regional in 2019 which he amended following season. On the other hand, it has also had no real chance of making the leap to higher state categories. In any case, this regularity, without ups and downs, has allowed him to maintain great stability while other more ambitious and more media-savvy teams have disappeared.

From beginning, women's team of SCD Independiente has played their matches at La Antoniana, like other teams in the club. The fact that this field was dirt until 2017 has been an obstacle to achieving growth achieved by other clubs in the city.

Season to season

References

External links
 Independiente squad (FFIB)

Women's football clubs in Spain
Association football clubs established in 1999
1999 establishments in Spain
Sport in Palma de Mallorca
Football clubs in the Balearic Islands